Deliana Meulenkamp (Rotterdam, Netherlands, July 3, 1933 – San Francisco, California, March 13, 2013), also known by her married name Delia Dooling, was a Dutch-born American competition swimmer who represented the United States at the 1952 Summer Olympics in Helsinki, Finland.  She competed in the women's 400-meter freestyle, advanced to the semifinals.  She held four American records during her swimming career.

Meulenkamp was born in Rotterdam, Netherlands, and had a brother Jack.  She was the beneficiary of a special act of the U.S. Congress signed by President Truman in order to become a U.S. citizen and compete in the Olympics as an American.  She became a media sensation at the 1952 Olympics when the good looks of the "copper-haired American swimmer" attracted the attention of newspaper and magazine photographers.  She later worked for Pacific Southwest Airlines and served as athletic director of the Metropolitan Club. She married Jack K. Dooling, a San Francisco attorney, and had two boys with him, John and Matthew. She died in San Francisco aged 79.

References

1933 births
2013 deaths
American female freestyle swimmers
Dutch emigrants to the United States
Olympic swimmers of the United States
Swimmers from Rotterdam
Swimmers from San Francisco
Swimmers at the 1952 Summer Olympics
Dutch female freestyle swimmers
Tamalpais High School alumni
21st-century American women